This is a list of films which have placed number one at the weekend box office in Venezuela during 2010.

Highest-grossing films

References

 

2010 in Venezuela
Venezuela
2010